The Highland Park Residential Historic District is a historic district in the Highland Park neighborhood of Pittsburgh, Pennsylvania, United States.  Almost 2,000 buildings are in the district, most of them residences. Many of the houses in this district were built from the 1860s into the 1930s, and are constructed in several Victorian and early 20th century styles.

The district is listed on the National Register of Historic Places.

References

External links

Houses on the National Register of Historic Places in Pennsylvania
Historic districts on the National Register of Historic Places in Pennsylvania
Historic districts in Pittsburgh
Houses in Pittsburgh
National Register of Historic Places in Pittsburgh